Sattleria is a genus of moths in the family Gelechiidae.

Species
 Sattleria angustispina Pitkin & Sattler, 1991
 Sattleria arcuata Pitkin & Sattler, 1991
 Sattleria basistrigella (Huemer, 1997)
 Sattleria breviramus Pitkin & Sattler, 1991
 Sattleria cottiella Huemer & Hebert, 2011
 Sattleria dinarica Huemer, 2014
 Sattleria dolomitica Huemer, 2014
 Sattleria dzieduszyckii (Nowicki, 1864)
 Sattleria graiaeella Huemer & Hebert, 2011
 Sattleria haemusi Huemer, 2014
 Sattleria izoardi Huemer & Sattler, 1992
 Sattleria karsholti Huemer & Hebert, 2011
 Sattleria melaleucella (Constant, 1865)
 Sattleria marguareisi Huemer & Sattler, 1992
 Sattleria pyrenaica (Petry, 1904)
 Sattleria sophiae Timossi, 2014
 Sattleria styriaca Pitkin & Sattler, 1991
 Sattleria triglavica Povolný, 1987

References

 
Gnorimoschemini